The Takhtasinh Parmar Prize, also known as Shri Takhtasinh Parmar Paritoshik, is a literary award presented by Gujarati Sahitya Parishad. The prize, which recognizes debut books by Gujarati authors, was established in 1981 and is awarded every other year.

Recipients
Recipients of the award include:

References

Awards established in 1981
Gujarati literary awards
1981 establishments in Gujarat